The Footwork FA17 was the car with which the Footwork team competed in the  Formula One season.  It was driven by Jos Verstappen, who moved from Simtek, and Ricardo Rosset, who graduated from Formula 3000.

Development
This was something of a disappointment, since the FA17 was competitive at the start of the year in the hands of Jos Verstappen. Technical director Alan Jenkins left early on in the season bound for Stewart. Walkinshaw replaced him with  Frank Dernie, who moved from Ligier along with Walkinshaw. The lack of development and the lack of power from the Hart V8 engine saw the team slip to the back of the grid by season's end. Hart had planned to build a V10 unit but did not have sufficient funds. Progress was further hampered by the team's testing contract with Bridgestone; the Japanese tyre supplier preparing for entry into F1 in 1997. The FA17 was the first Arrows driven by Damon Hill upon his signing for the team ahead of the 1997 season.

Race history
Throughout the season, Verstappen proved to be very much the faster Footwork driver, but his reliability record was poor, only finishing a single race in the first half of the season (at Buenos Aires, where he finished sixth). He suffered numerous mechanical failures, including a sticking throttle which caused a huge accident at Spa which left him with permanent neck injuries. He also caused a major scare at Imola when he left a pit stop early and ripped the fuel hose from its tank, covering the garage with flammable fuel. By contrast, Rosset was surprisingly steady for a rookie driver, finishing half the races, but was noticeably slower than his teammate.  Ultimately, neither driver was retained for 1997; World Champion Damon Hill made the surprising decision to join the team after being dumped by Williams, and Pedro Diniz with his sponsorship money was chosen to be his number two.

The team eventually finished ninth in the Constructors' Championship, with one point.

After Formula One 
The Austrian racing driver Fritz Glatz used a Footwork FA17 in the 2002 EuroBOSS series. At the race in Most after a collision he became airborne and rolled the car. Glatz, driving under the pseudonym “Frederico Careca”, died from internal bleeding and major vertebral injuries.

Complete Formula One results
(key) (results in bold indicate pole position)

References

Arrows Formula One cars
1996 Formula One season cars